The 1936 Western Reserve Red Cats football team represented Western Reserve University, now known as Case Western Reserve University, during the 1936 college football season. The team was led by second-year head coach Bill Edwards, assisted by Roy A. "Dugan" Miller and George Brown.  Notable players included Frank "Doc" Kelker, Ray Zeh, Phil Ragazzo, Gene Myslenski, and Albie Litwak.  The team went undefeated beating opponents by a combined 244-28, the defense posting six shutouts.

The annual Thanksgiving Day rivalry game against  was postponed due to heavy snow.

Schedule

References

Western Reserve
Case Western Reserve Spartans football seasons
College football undefeated seasons
Western Reserve Red Cats football